Israel sent a delegation to compete at the 1984 Summer Paralympics in Stoke Mandeville, United Kingdom and Long Island, New York, United States of America. Its athletes finished 19th in the overall medal count.

Nations at the 1984 Summer Paralympics
1984
Summer Paralympics